The Search and Rescue Training Unit (SARTU) of the Royal Air Force was located on the southern side of RAF Valley on the Isle of Anglesey, Wales.

History 

Training for specialist Search and Rescue (SAR) roles in the Royal Air Force began in November 1958 with the creation of a training flight at RAF St. Mawgan, which then moved to RAF Valley. The first dedicated training of RAF SAR crews was undertaken in the early 1960s at RAF Valley by 3 Squadron of the Central Flying School (Helicopter), a lodger from RAF Tern Hill. It operated the Westland Whirlwind HAR.10. It later became the Search and Rescue Training Squadron and then, as part of the reorganisation of the SAR fleet, in December 1979, it became the Search and Rescue Training Unit (SARTU).

The Whirlwind was replaced with the Westland Wessex HAR.2 in 1985. The Wessex was a more capable aircraft with better performance and lifting capabilities, allowing more realistic training to be undertaken.

SARTU became part of the newly established Defence Helicopter Flying School on 1 April 1997, when it re-equipped with the Bell Griffin HT1. FB Heliservices (part of Cobham plc) were contracted to provide the aircraft, engineers and flight line for the unit in 1997, and FB Heliservices started to introduce the AgustaWestland AW139 in 2009.

The unit was re-numbered as 202 Squadron in May 2016 and continues to provide helicopter training for the British armed forces.

Other training
SARTU is also used as the base for many other air courses.  Most notable is No. 60 Squadron RAF, from the Defence Helicopter Flying School at RAF Shawbury, which sends each of their ab-initio pilots and crewman to SARTU to learn the basic skills needed for Search and Rescue missions and Mountain Flying.

See also

 RAF Search and Rescue Force

References

Fire and rescue in the United Kingdom
Training units and formations of the Royal Air Force
Military units and formations established in 1979